Nysa was a town in ancient Euboea, where the vine was said to put forth leaves and bear fruit in the same day.

References

Populated places in ancient Euboea
Former populated places in Greece
Lost ancient cities and towns